Betauna  is a village development committee in Siraha District in the Sagarmatha Zone of south-eastern Nepal. At the time of the 2011 Nepal census In this Village  Mainly  ( Pal/ Raut /Gaderi /Vediyaar /Mahato /Yadav / Mandal /Roy ) And many others People Cast Live in this village ! This Village is developing Village !!

In 2074 this village was Turned into "Municipality " named Goalbazar -12 From Betauna !
The Major Profession of People of this Village is Agriculture .
it had a population of 5077 people living in 992 individual households.\ 
Edited by Suman Kumar Pal 
+9779817703255 ,033-693497

References

External links
UN map of the municipalities of  Siraha District

Populated places in Siraha District